G protein-coupled receptor kinase 4 (GRK4) is an enzyme that in humans is encoded by the GRK4 gene.

This gene encodes a member of the G protein-coupled receptor kinase subfamily of the Ser/Thr protein kinase family, and is most similar to GRK5 and GRK6.

G protein-coupled receptor kinases phosphorylate activated G protein-coupled receptors, which promotes the binding of an arrestin protein to the receptor. Arrestin binding to a phosphorylated, active receptor prevents receptor stimulation of heterotrimeric G protein transducer proteins, blocking their cellular signaling and resulting in receptor desensitization. Arrestin binding to a phosphorylated, active receptor also enables receptor signaling through arrestin partner proteins. Thus the GRK/arrestin system serves as a signaling switch for G protein-coupled receptors.

GRK4 is most expressed in the testes, with low amounts in the brain, kidney and other tissues. It has four alternatively-spliced variants.

Polymorphisms in the GRK4 gene have been linked to both genetic and acquired hypertension, acting in part through kidney dopamine receptors.

References

Further reading

EC 2.7.11